John McKenzie was a New Zealand cricketer who played for Otago.

McKenzie made three first-class appearances for the team, between the 1893–94 and 1894–95 seasons.

From the four innings in which he batted, McKenzie made a top score of 74 runs, against Hawke's Bay, the second-highest score of the New Zealand team.

McKenzie was a lower order batsman.

See also
 List of Otago representative cricketers

External links
John McKenzie at Cricket Archive

Year of birth missing
Year of death missing
New Zealand cricketers
Otago cricketers